Abbas Mohamed (born 27 October 1963) is a Nigerian long-distance runner. He competed in the men's marathon at the 1988 Summer Olympics.

References

1963 births
Living people
Athletes (track and field) at the 1988 Summer Olympics
Nigerian male long-distance runners
Nigerian male marathon runners
Olympic athletes of Nigeria
Place of birth missing (living people)